The following lists events that happened during 2015 in Kenya.

Incumbents
President: Uhuru Kenyatta
Deputy President: William Ruto
Chief Justice: Willy Mutunga

Events

January
 January 4 - A six-story building collapse in Nairobi kills one person and leaves several others injured.
 January 5 - For the second day in a row a multi-story residential building in Nairobi collapses, this time an 8-story building, killing one person with eight people still missing.

April 
 April 2 - Gunmen attack Garissa University College, killing at least 140 people and wounding 65 others.

Deaths

December
December 19 - Dick Wathika, 42, a politician, Mayor of Nairobi

References

 
Kenya
Kenya
Years of the 21st century in Kenya
2010s in Kenya